Onyemachi Maxwell Ogbulu commonly known as O. M. Ogbulu is a Nigerian academic. He is the 8th and current Vice-Chancellor of Abia State University Uturu since December, 2021.

References 

Living people
Nigerian male writers
Academic staff of Abia State University
Igbo academics
Vice-Chancellors of Abia State University Uturu
1956 births